QQaifah Al Mahn Al-Jawf is a sub-district located in Al Quraishyah District, Al Bayda Governorate, Yemen. QQaifah Al Mahn Al-Jawf had a population of 2407 according to the 2004 census.

References 

Sub-districts in Al Quraishyah District